John Baldwin Rawlinson (1 May 1867 – 12 May 1945) was an English first-class cricketer and stockbroker.

The son of Robert Rawlinson, he was born in May 1867 at Whitehaven. He was educated at Malvern College, before going up to Brasenose College, Oxford. While studying at Oxford, he made a single appearance in first-class cricket for Oxford University against A. J. Webbe's XI at Oxford in 1887. Batting once in the match, he was dismissed without scoring in the Oxford first innings by John Rawlin, while with the ball he took a single wicket when he dismissed Albert Leatham in the A. J. Webbe's XI first innings. Rawlinson died at Kensington in May 1945.

References

External links

1867 births
1945 deaths
Sportspeople from Whitehaven
Cricketers from Cumbria
People educated at Malvern College
Alumni of Brasenose College, Oxford
English cricketers
Oxford University cricketers